Sarnau may refer to:

 Sarnau, a constituent community of Lahntal, Marburg-Biedenkopf, Germany
 Sarnau, a village in Carmarthenshire, Wales
 Sarnau railway station in Carmarthenshire, Wales
 Sarnau, a village in Ceredigion, Wales